Emanuel Herrera Batista (born 18 December 1990), known professionally as El Alfa El Jefe, or simply as El Alfa, is a Dominican rapper, known as "The King of Dembow". Batista was born in Bajos de Haina, Santo Domingo. He is known for his sensual voice and initial afro hairstyle which led him to popularity in the early 2010s through songs like "Tarzan", "Coche Bomba" and "Muevete Jevi". He went on to form good relationships with many artists from Puerto Rico, such as Nicky Jam, Farruko, and Myke Towers amongst others. This resulted in one of the biggest collaborations in dembow history, led by El Alfa, when he released "Suave (Remix)" in December 2018 alongside Chencho Corleone, Bryant Myers, Miky Woodz, Jon Z and Noriel.

El Alfa's reach continued to grow in the coming years, when he collaborated with international stars like Cardi B, J Balvin, Pitbull, Tyga, and Black Eyed Peas. "Singapur" surpassed the 200 million mark in February 2021.

With more than 15,500,000 monthly listeners to his music on Spotify and ranked #164 in the world, El Alfa is considered the leader of the Dominican dembow genre.

Career

2008–2013: Career beginnings and Dembow Exitos 
Batista became independent from his family at the age of 17 after a childhood where he dreamed of becoming a barber.

Instead, once he became independent, his musical career started in 2008, when he went on to form a duo with Eddy Wilson, another Dominican Dembow artist looking to make his name on the scene. In their short stint together, they released street-style dembow songs such as "El Fogon" and "Conmigo No". The duo broke up in 2009 as they opted to continue their careers as solo artists.

Batista's first release as a solo artist was "Coche Bomba" in 2009, a song that made waves in the Dominican Urban scene at the time, cementing himself as an upcoming artist in the Dominican Republic known as El Alfa El Jefe. He followed the success of "Coco Mordan" in 2010, another song that showed the capabilities of his high-pitched voice with a hard-hitting beat. In 2011, he found relative success with two songs released in the final couple of months of the year, "No Wiri Wiri" and "Agarrate Que Te Solté". But the first time El Alfa truly entered the regional scene as an up-and-coming superstar was in 2012 when he released "Cacao", "Con To' Lo' Cascabeles" and "Muevete Jevi". The latter would continue to be one of his most popular songs, as it amassed more than 3 million streams on Spotify in recent years. He then managed to group those songs onto Dembow Exitos in 2013, a 10-song album that was an example of what the El Alfa character represented: hard-hitting, fast beats coupled with his rare, high-pitched voice that was backed by the productions of Nico Clinico, Bubloy, El Kable and fellow Dominican artist Chimbala.

El Alfa's popularity continued to rise when he released "Fuin Fuan" in April 2013, continuing his style of high-paced dembow with a touch of DJ Patio's productions. He managed to secure important collaborations in that year too, performing "Humo Excúsame (Remix)" with Musicologo The Libro and "Tú Me Gusta Pila" with Puerto Rican artist Farruko. The latter collaboration would be an important one for years to come in the career of El Alfa El Jefe.

2014–2016: Regional growth, national controversy, and Dembow Exitos 2.0 
The success of his music in the early 2010s launched him into regional stardom, as he began to record with the likes of Jowell & Randy, Nicky Jam, Tempo , and Arcángel from Puerto Rico's Reggaeton industry. His success on the local scene however was threatened by a number of rivals, most notably El Mayor Clasico, who he was embroiled in a fierce rivalry with. After both succeeded in controlling a large portion of the street dembow genre in 2014 and began to compete at parties and clubs, they battled against each other with diss tracks. In a twist to his usual humorous side, El Alfa sent out a strong message to the dembow community that he is here to stay when El Mayor was on the receiving end of "No Te Panike", a dembow-style diss track that was aggressive yet catchy. El Mayor would reply with his own diss track "Ratrero" a week later, heating up the rivalry between them as the genre began to grow externally.

El Alfa, who had no intention of stopping at the point, went on to release his biggest track to date, "Tarzan". The song, which describes his sexual relations with a woman who 'screams like Tarzan', saw him quickly rise in popularity and catch the eye of some of Puerto Rico's biggest artists, namely Nicky Jam. Tarzan formed part of Dembow Exitos 2.0, El Alfa's second album which mainly followed the same format as the first. Once again, the likes of Bubloy produced the album alongside DJ Plano, but it was the exploits of Nico Clinico that really helped El Alfa shine and rise through the ranks.

In 2015, after receiving criticism for insulting the founding fathers of the Dominican Republic in a music video, El Alfa was sentenced to 15 days of community service. The President of El Instituto Duartino, Cesar Romero called for the boycott and destruction of El Alfa's albums for having disrespected the founding fathers. Part of El Alfa's sentencing was to clean the Plaza de la Bandera and to sing the national anthem for two hours for fifteen consecutive days. Additionally, El Alfa was ordered to hand out educational pamphlets about the founding fathers at traffic lights in Santo Domingo. He considered the situation a misunderstanding. This didn't stop El Alfa from succeeding on the musical scene however, as collaborations with a number of Dominican artists – Don Miguelo, Shelow Shaq, Quimico Ultra Mega, El Mega, Nfasis, and El Super Nuevo – in the same year allowed him to continue pushing towards the highest ranks of the genre. The biggest success of that year would be "Pal de Velitas" with Mark B, a song produced by Chael Produciendo that surpassed 20 million views on YouTube. This up-and-coming producer would continue to form a part of El Alfa's team for the coming years of fame.

Chael produced two songs for El Alfa in 2016, "No Hay Forma" and "Segueta (Remix)" ft. Nicky Jam. Alongside him, El Alfa began to excel in a sub-genre of Dembow called "TrapBow", which is a mix between American trap and Dembow. It first emerged in "Banda De Camion", one of El Alfa's most successful solo songs to date. El Alfa's first verse was made up of 24 bars, a level he wasn't accustomed to hitting. This song caught the eyes of fans across Latin America and would go on to open the doors for more potential collaborations between the Puerto Rican and Dominican urban music industries. He went on to record "Nadie Como Tú" with Nicky Jam and "Una Papi Que La Mima" with Tempo and Farruko before the end of the year. The duo of El Alfa and Chael had started to create a new level of success for urban Dominican artists, as El Alfa toured Europe for the first time in 2016 after a promising 2015 in the United States.

2017–present: Disciplina 

El Alfa celebrated his 10-year career with a concert at Palacio de los Deportes Virgilio Travieso Soto on 3 September 2018, being the first Latin urban artist to headline that venue. He has released collaborations with Anuel AA, Bad Bunny, and Nicky Jam.

2 November 2018 – El Alfa released "Mi Mami" featuring Cardi B.
8 April 2021 – El Alfa released the single "La Mama De La Mama" featuring CJ, El Cherry Scom & Chael Produciendo. The song "La Mama De La Mama" was released under his own record label "El Jefe Record" and published by Solo E Group, RM Music Publishing and Warne, r Chappell under BMI Broadcast Music. The song "La Mama De La Mama" has over 111,000,000 plus million views on YouTube as well as 92,000,000 plus millions on Spotify and soon after the released, in May 2021 "La Mama De La Mama" debuted in the Global Top 200 on the Billboard.
26 July 2021 – El Alfa accused record owner "Bibi Top Dollar" of burning his Bugatti sports car and threatening him, other than the accusation from El Alfa, no further details were given.
30 July 2021 – El Alfa released La Mama De La Ma (Remix) featuring Busta Rhymes, Anitta (singer), CJ (rapper), Wisin & El Cherry Scom, the song was released and published by El Jefe Records, RM Music Publishing, Warner Music Group, Solo E Group, Kobalt Music Group and Sony Music Latin.
10 August 2021 – El Alfa announced his first-ever world tour beginning in the U.S. in the fall of 2021.

Awards and nominations 
Nomination and award-winning of the Univision 34th edition of Premio Lo Nuestro, for Male Revelation Artist and Best Tropical Song Of The Year and

Discography

Studio albums

Compilation albums

Extended plays

Singles

As lead artist

As featured artist

Other singles 
"Que Fue" featuring Tali Goya
"Moviéndolo (Remix)" with Pitbull and Wisin & Yandel
"La Mama De La Mama (Remix)" featuring Busta Rhymes, Anita, CJ, Wisin, El Cherry Scom, Chael Produciendo

Other charted and certified songs

References 

1990 births
Living people
Caribbean musicians
Dominican Republic hip hop musicians
Dominican Republic rappers
Dominican Republic songwriters
Male songwriters
Spanish-language singers
21st-century Dominican Republic people